Indefatigable may refer to:

Ships
 , several ships of the name in the British Royal Navy
 , a British training ship
 
 Indefatigable (1799 ship), a merchant ship used to transport convicts to Australia
 Indefatigable (aka "The Indie"), a key ship in the Horatio Hornblower series of novels by C. S. Forester

Other uses
 Indefatigable gas field, a petroleum gas field
 Indefatigable SW, a petroleum gas field; see Bacton Gas Terminal
 Indefatigable Island, in the Galapagos
 Mount Indefatigable, a mountain in Canada